Alpha Omar Wann (born 2 July 1989), also known as Phaal or Philly Phaal, is a French rapper and songwriter, and was the main member of the band 1995 that also included Nekfeu, Areno Jaz, Fonky Flav', Sneazzy and DJ Lo' (aka Hologramme Lo'). He was also member of the band L'entourage.
He is the founder of Don Dada Records, and he signed to Universal Music.

A founding member of 1995, Alpha Wann launched also a solo career releasing three consecutive EPs as a trilogy known as Alph Lauren. On 21 September 2018, he released his debut album, Une main lave l'autre also known as UMLA which was certified gold a year later. At the end of 2020, he released his successful mixtape

Discography

Albums

EPs

Mixtapes

Singles

Songs featured in

Other charted songs

*Did not appear in the official Belgian Ultratop 50 charts, but rather in the bubbling under Ultratip charts.

References

External links
Facebook

Rappers from Paris
1989 births
Living people